Jonathan Wang is a Taiwanese-American film producer best known for Swiss Army Man (2016) and Everything Everywhere All at Once (2022). He is the long-time producing collaborator of the director duo known as the Daniels (Daniel Scheinert and Daniel Kwan). Wang began his career in music video production and later pivoted to feature films with his debut feature Swiss Army Man, which won the Sundance 2016 U.S. Dramatic Directing Award. Since then, he has produced multiple feature films, including Everything Everywhere All at Once, which has become A24's highest-grossing film of all time, and for which Wang won the Academy Award for Best Picture.

Filmography 
Feature films

 The Legend of Ochi (2023)
 Everything Everywhere All at Once (2022)
 False Positive (2021)
 The Death of Dick Long (2019)
 Swiss Army Man (2016)

Short films

 Memory 2.0 (2014)
 Possibilia (2014)
 I Have No Hold on You (2014)
 I Have No Hold on You (2012)
 Plastiki and the Material of the Future (2011)
 Engine Block (2011)

Music videos

 Joywave Feat. Kopps: Tongues
 DJ Snake and Lil Jon: Turn Down for What
 Passion Pit: Cry Like a Ghost
 David Guetta Feat. Ne-Yo & Akon: Play Hard
 Skrillex Feat. The Doors: Breakn' a Sweat, Version 2
 David Guetta feat. Sia: She Wolf (Falling to Pieces)
 Bob Dylan: Duquesne Whistle
 Foster the People: Don't Stop (Color on the Walls)
 Tenacious D: Rize of the Fenix
 Kimbra feat. Mark Foster & A-Trak: Warrior
 The Shins: Simple Song
 Battles Feat. Gary Numan: My Machines
 Lenny Kravitz: Stand

TV

 Mason (pre-production)
 L.A. Rangers (2013)

Awards and nominations 

 Academy Award for Best Picture (2023) – Everything Everywhere All at Once (won)
 BAFTA Award for Best Film (2023) – Everything Everywhere All at Once (nominated)
 Golden Globe Award for Best Motion Picture – Musical or Comedy (2023) – Everything Everywhere All at Once (nominated)
 Grammy Award for Best Music Video (2015) – "Turn Down for What" (nominated)
 Independent Spirit Award for Best Film (2023) – Everything Everywhere All at Once (won)
 Producers Guild of America Award for Best Theatrical Motion Picture (2023) – Everything Everywhere All at Once (won)

References

External links 

American film producers
American people of Taiwanese descent
Independent Spirit Award winners
Living people
Producers who won the Best Picture Academy Award
Taiwanese film producers
Taiwanese emigrants to the United States
Year of birth missing (living people)